A by-election was held for the New South Wales Legislative Assembly electorate of Parramatta on 12 February 1916 following the death of sitting Nationalist Party member, Tom Moxham.

Results

See also
Electoral results for the district of Parramatta
List of New South Wales state by-elections

Notes

References

1916 elections in Australia
New South Wales state by-elections
1910s in New South Wales